Kinnoull Hill is a hill located partly in Perth and partly in Kinfauns, Perth and Kinross, Scotland. It shares its name with the nearby Kinnoull parish.

Summit
In view from the -high south-facing summit is the Friarton Bridge, a stretch of the Tay Coast railway line and the Sidlaw Hills. Further to the south, Moncreiffe Hill can be seen.

Kinnoull Tower
On an outcrop a few hundred yards to the east of, and several feet below, the summit is Kinnoull Tower, a folly built in the eighteenth century, by Thomas Hay, 9th Earl of Kinnoull, to resemble castles along the Rhine he had admired in Germany during his Grand Tour of Europe. Kinnoull saw a similarity between the mountainous landscape along the Rhine and the rocky outcrops on his estate near Perth. On his return, to achieve a similar effect, he built a modest castle on the highest point of Kinnoull Hill, with its tower overlooking the River Tay. The tower is a Category B listed structure.

Another of Hay's lasting legacies is the Perth Bridge over the Tay, which he helped fund.

Jane Austen visited Kinnoull Hill in September 1789. She described Kinnoull Tower in "Lesley Castle", one of two Scottish stories in her Juvenilia, as: 
An old and Mouldering Castle, which is situated two miles from Perth on a bold projecting Rock, and commands an extensive view of the Town and its delightful Environs.Today the tower is more easily accessible, via a winding footpath through the woodland park.

Awards 
In 2009 and again in 2010, Kinnoull Hill was awarded Green Flag status.
In 2010, Kinnoull Hill Woodland Park also came runner up in Scotland's Finest Woods Awards.

Management
Kinnoull Hill Woodland Park is managed in a partnership between Forestry and Land Scotland and Perth & Kinross Council. A Users Group has also been established for many years and supports the management of the Woodland Park through a Management Committee. Branklyn Garden was built by Dorothy Renton and her husband on the hill. The house and garden are owned by the National Trust.

Sculptures
Woodland sculptures created by Pete Bowsher have been erected in the Woodland Park. There are 14 sculptures reflecting the animals and plants of the park.

Suicide location
The hill's summit has become well-known as a location for suicides. In 2015 it became "highlighted as a national area of concern for completed suicides". That same year, 20-year-old Forfar Athletic player Jack Syme committed suicide at Kinnoull Hill.

In early January 2002, Daniela Smith, a 31-year-old mother-of-two, pushed her infant children off the hill's summit while they were strapped in their pushchair, before throwing herself off.

Namesakes
The Kinnoull Campus of De La Salle College in Melbourne, Australia, is named after this hill. The property previously on the site of the College, built in 1856 by Sir James Palmer, was renamed Kinnoull by Sir Alexander Stewart (1874-1956) (former chairman of BHP), who was born near Kinnoull Hill.

Abernyte Brewery released a beer called Kinnoull Red, named for the hill.

Gallery

See also
Deuchny Wood

References

External links

 Descriptive Gazetteer - Kinnoull, Perthshire through time
 Walk in Scotland's "Walk of the Month" - Autumn on Kinnoull Hill, Perth
 Kinnoull.org.uk
 - Explore Kinnoull Hill Woodland Park - Perth and Kinross Countryside Trust

Landforms of Perth, Scotland
Mountains and hills of Perth and Kinross
Sites of Special Scientific Interest in East Perth
Clan Hay